Nartopa or Nartupa (Pashto/Hindko: نرتوپہ) is a Pashtun dominated village in Hazro Tehsil, Attock District in Punjab province, Pakistan.

Demographics
The population consists of Muslims and the local languages include Pashto, Hindko and Persian.Originally those who have migrated from Afghanistan. Nartopa's population is approximately 8,000, with a literacy rate of about 59%. It produces a number of crops and products. This village is surrounded by other villages such as Behboodi, Malak Mala and Bhangi which are Pashtun dominant villages. Nartopa is also the second biggest village in Attock after ghurgusti.

References

Villages in Attock District